Havelock Constituency was a constituency in Singapore. It used to exist from 1955 to 1980.

Member of Parliament

Elections

Elections in 1950s

Elections in 1960s

Historical maps

References

Singaporean electoral divisions
Geylang